Stuart Daniel Baker (November 7, 1954), better known by his stage name Unknown Hinson, is an American singer, musician, songwriter, comedian, and actor.

Biography
Stuart Daniel Baker, a music teacher and studio musician from Albemarle, North Carolina, created his alter-ego for The Wild Wild South, a Charlotte-area public-access program that featured comedy sketches and concert footage. Baker and co-star Don Swan played the characters of Unknown Hinson and Rebel Helms, respectively. After Swan's death in 1995, Baker created The Unknown Hinson Show, a direct spin-off of The Wild Wild South. The Unknown Hinson Show won Creative Loafing Charlotte's "Best Of" poll for Best Public-Access Television Show four years in a row. After the series ended, Baker continued in his role as Unknown Hinson, performing live concerts and releasing several recordings.

Career

Live performing career
Hinson has shared the stage with many notable rockabilly, country, and psychobilly acts such as The Reverend Horton Heat, Marty Stuart, Hank III, and Ed King. Hank III, grandson of Hank Williams, has Hinson's face tattooed on his biceps.
In late 2008, working under his real name of Stuart Baker, Hinson was hired to play bass as well as lead guitar in Billy Bob Thornton's band The Boxmasters. For this  gig, Baker appears without the familiar Unknown Hinson wardrobe and makeup, instead appearing in a vintage '60s suit, white shirt, and black pencil tie. His manager and booking agent was his wife, Margo Baker.

According to a November 10, 2012, post on his Facebook page, Hinson decided to quit touring after 17 years. His last three shows were Fort Wayne, Indiana, on November 17 in Covington, Kentucky. He cited rising costs and indicated his plans to find something new to do. After the death of his wife, Margo Baker, Unknown Hinson resumed touring again.

On June 3, 2020, Baker announced on his Facebook page that he wouldn't be playing any more shows, due to osteoarthritis.

Recording career
Unknown Hinson wrote his own music, and produced all of his own recordings. His music often parodied the dark elements of contemporary country and redneck culture. In early 2009, Hinson's "Torture Town" won in The 8th Annual Independent Music Awards and Vox Pop vote for Best Alternative Country.

Voice acting career
Hinson, credited as Baker, provided the voice of Early Cuyler, a balding hillbilly squid from Georgia, on Cartoon Network's late night Adult Swim program Squidbillies for 15 years.

Dolly Parton controversy and fallout
On August 13, 2020, Baker received backlash after posting controversial remarks about Dolly Parton, calling her a "bimbo" and "slut" on his Facebook page in response to a recent news article concerning Parton's support of the Black Lives Matter movement. Not long after this post, the Facebook page went offline, but returned on the following day with the posts concerning Parton removed. Baker subsequently posted a response to those who were upset, saying "Leave Liberals", calling them "UN-AMERICAN", stating that they "bow down to the ALL-KNOWING-MINORITY", and telling them to have fun "forsaking your own race, culture, and heritage."

The producers of Squidbillies fired Baker from the series over his remarks. Reverend Guitars of Ohio abruptly stopped marketing their Stuart Baker signature series guitars on August 14, 2020 and posted, "we are no longer associated with Unknown Hinson. We have stopped production on his guitars and we have removed him from our website."

Works

Discography

Filmography

References

External links
Official Facebook page
Paper + Wire Magazine: An Interview with Unknown Hinson

Alter egos
American country singer-songwriters
American male singer-songwriters
Psychobilly musicians
American rockabilly guitarists
Independent Music Awards winners
1954 births
Singer-songwriters from North Carolina
American male voice actors
21st-century American male actors
Male actors from North Carolina
People from Albemarle, North Carolina
Country musicians from North Carolina
Living people